Celebrity Splash! is a Polish reality television series about celebrities trying to master the art of diving. The format for the show is a franchise that originated in the Netherlands by television production company Eyeworks., and was broadcast on SBS 6 as Sterren Springen (Celebrities Jump).

Krzysztof Jankowski and Łukasz Grass present the show.

Cast

Scoring chart

 Indicates the celebrity safe in the Splash-off that week.
 Indicates the celebrity eliminated in the Splash-off that week.
 Indicates the celebrity eliminated that week.
 Indicates the winning celebrity.
 Indicates the runner-up celebrity.
 Indicates the third place celebrity.
 The diver withdrew from the competition.
Red numbers indicate the lowest score for each week.
Green numbers indicate the highest score for each week.
"—" The celebrity did not dive that week.
 Andrzej Młynarczyk was eliminated in episode one. He returned in episode two replacing Maciej Dowbor, who withdrew because of an injury.

Average score chart 
This table only counts for dives scored on a traditional 30-points scale.

Live show details

Week 1 (7 March)

Judges' votes to save
 Otylia: Aleksandra Ciupa
 Tomasz: Andrzej Młynarczyk
 Danuta: Aleksandra Ciupa

Week 2 (14 March)

Judges' votes to save
 Otylia: Radosław Liszewski
 Tomasz: Odeta Moro
 Danuta: Radosław Liszewski

Week 3 (21 March)

Judges' votes to save
 Otylia: Przemysław Cypryański
 Tomasz: Przemysław Cypryański
 Danuta: Przemysław Cypryański

Week 4 (28 March)

Judges' votes to save
 Otylia: Tomasz Puzon
 Tomasz: Tomasz Puzon
 Danuta: Włodzimierz Matuszak

Week 5 (4 April)

Week 6 (11 April)

Week 7 (18 April)

Week 8 (25 April)

Viewing figures

References

Polish reality television series
Celebrity reality television series